Bigbandblast! (released 24 August 2004 by Real Music Records in Oslo) is an album by the big band Bigbandblast led by Børre Dalhaug.

Reception 

Bigbandblast! sounds like the drummer of The Real Thing has assembled a hard-swinging big band, with stylistically eclectic choice of music, like Latin, backbeat, swing and heavy metal, but the common thread is preserved in that it is the same musicians playing on all the tracks. It was nominated for Spellemannprisen 2004, and received splendid reviews in the press.

The review by the Norwegian newspaper Bergens Tidende awarded the album 5 stars (dice).

Track listing 
"Shoeshine Shuffle" (5:14)
"Up Front" (6:48)	
"Moving On" (4:48)	
"The Real Thing" (4:57)
"Gaudium Reditus" (5:09)
"Schmell" (5:34)
"Adaptive" (5:19)
"Roger That" (5:28)
"Ad Infinitum" (6:13)
"Utopia" (4:36)
"The Real Thing" (3:02)

Personnel 
Jarle Bernhoft - vocals
Kåre Nymark Jr. - trumpet
Marius Haltli - trumpet
Frode Nymo - alt saxophone
Atle Nymo - tenor saxophone
Børge-Are Halvorsen - saxophones & flute
Even Kruse Skatrud - trombone
Nils-Olav Johansen - guitar
Frode Kjekstad - guitar
Jens Thoresen - guitar
Stian Carstensen - accordion
Anders Aarum - piano
Palle Wagnberg - Hammond B3 organ
Jens Fossum - double bass
Børre Dalhaug - drums

Credits 
Compositions and lyrics by Børre Dalhaug

References 

Jazz albums by Norwegian artists
2004 albums